Yoko Kato (Katō Yōko, born 9 November 1952) is a Japanese neurosurgeon. She is professor and chair of the Department of Neurosurgery at Fujita Health University.  She was the first woman in Japan to be promoted to full professor of neurosurgery.

Biography
Yoko Kato received her Doctor of Medicine degree in 1978 from Aichi Medical University, where she also completed her residency in the department of neurosurgery. She joined the neurosurgery department at Fujita Health University in 1980, then became an instructor in the department of neurosurgery at Suzhou Medical College in 1981. Kato returned to Fujita Health University as an assistant instructor in 1983. She was promoted to assistant professor in 1988 and associate professor in 2000. She has held visiting professorships at the University of Mainz (1995), George Washington University (1998), and Sri Ramachandra University (2000). In 2006, Kato was promoted to full professor, becoming the first female professor of neurosurgery in Japan. She was named chief of Fujita Health University Banbuntane Hotokukai Hospital's Stroke Center in 2014.

Kato specializes in surgical treatment of cerebrovascular disease, particularly aneurysms and arteriovenous malformations. She has performed more than 1,800 brain aneurysmal clipping procedures throughout her career.

Kato is a proponent for the advancement of neurosurgery in developing countries by directly mentoring neurosurgeons, organizing educational courses, and donating funds for neurosurgical equipment. She also advocates for inclusion of women in neurosurgery. She founded the Women's Neurosurgical Association (WNA) of Japan in 1990 and the Asian Women's Neurosurgical Association (AWNA) in 1996. Kato has spoken about experiences of bias against woman surgeons, such as being mistaken for support staff or perceived as less focused due to family duties. She has advocated for improved research mentorship and access to childcare resources to address gender disparities in academic neurosurgery, as well as increased visibility of successful female neurosurgeons to encourage female trainees to join the profession.

Awards
 2021 AANS International Lifetime Recognition Award, American Association of Neurological Surgeons
 2019 Medal of Honor, World Federation of Neurosurgical Societies
 2019 Honorary Fellowship, American College of Surgeons

Selected publications

Books

References

External links
Works by Yoko Kato

1952 births
Living people
Japanese neurosurgeons
Women surgeons
Academic staff of Fujita Health University